= Hinrich Foundation =

1. REDIRECT Draft:Hinrich Foundation
